Carlos Pifarré Forner (born 5 May 1990) is a Spanish professional footballer who played for Oxford City as a midfielder.

Football career
Born in La Vall d'Uixó, Castellón, Valencian Community, Pifarré finished his formation with Villarreal CF, making his senior debuts with UD Almansa in the 2009–10 season, in Tercera División. In 2011, he first arrived in Segunda División B, signing with CD Dénia.

In July 2012 Pifarré joined Real Murcia, initially assigned to the reserves in the fourth level. On 30 November he made his professional debut, coming on as a late substitute in a 0–0 home draw against Real Madrid Castilla in the Segunda División championship. He finished the season with only three first-team appearances, all from the bench.

On 7 July 2013 Pifarré moved to CD Olímpic de Xàtiva in division three.

During the summer of 2015 he moved to Oxford City of National League South, the 6th tier of English football, failing to impress as the club finished in a mid table position and being released at the end of his contract.

References

External links
 
 
 

1990 births
Living people
Spanish footballers
Footballers from the Valencian Community
Association football midfielders
Segunda División players
Segunda División B players
Tercera División players
Real Murcia players
CD Olímpic de Xàtiva footballers
Atlético Saguntino players